Robert Coke may refer to:

Robert Coke (MP for Coventry and Fowey) (1587–1653), MP for Coventry, 1614–1621 and Fowey, 1624
Sir Robert Coke, 2nd Baronet (1645–1688), MP for Derbyshire
Robert Coke (MP for King's Lynn) (1651–1679), MP for King's Lynn 1675–1679
Robert Coke (18th century MP), Whig politician in Norfolk 1734
Robert Coke (investor) (born 1972), British investor

See also
Robert Cooke (disambiguation)
Robert Cook (disambiguation)
Coke (disambiguation)